The American-based international automotive conglomerate General Motors (GM) underpins its many vehicle models with various platforms. These platforms are established sets of axles, suspensions, and steering mechanisms which fit various bodies and powertrains from various marques that GM owns.

From the early twentieth century, a Latin letter-based naming scheme was used to designate platforms, which were aimed at vehicles under different brands that served similar niches of the market. For example, the B platform was the base for fullsize, rear-wheel drive (RWD) sedans and wagons from 1926 to 1996. This platform underpinned vehicles made by Buick, Cadillac, Chevrolet, Marquette, Pontiac, and Oldsmobile. During the 1970s and 1980s, GM introduced many new front-wheel drive (FWD) platforms for the first time, such as the FWD C platform introduced in 1985. Despite being mechanically very new and different, it kept the same name as the RWD C platform for the sake of consistency, as most of the models remained the same, such as the Oldsmobile 98. For most of these platforms, the platform name is the fourth character of a vehicle's VIN, with a notable exception being trucks, for which it is the fifth character.

At the outset of the twenty-first century, General Motors' approach to platforms changed, and so did the nomenclature they use. Platforms themselves are now referred to by GM as "architectures", and are now named according to the English-language names of letters from the Greek alphabet, such as the subcompact Gamma platform. Today, many of the since-discontinued Latin letter platforms are informally called "bodies", such as "J-body", which refers to the J platform. In the 2010s, GM once again began to change platform nomenclature, this time to a four-character format: platform-generation-XX. An example of this is the D2XX, from the second generation of the Delta platform, hence the "D" and "2".

All but three platforms listed here use a front-mounted engine, and those exceptions are noted in the 'layout' column.

In production 
As of April 2020, GM produces cars, trucks, and sport utility vehicles (SUVs) of multiple different sizes on 19 different platforms: 7 of which are inherently RWD, with the rest being FWD. All but 5 of these have four-wheel drive variants as well.

The GM nomenclature works as follows: 

1st position is the platform:
 A – Alpha
 C – Chi
 D – Delta
 G – Gamma
 E – Epsilon
 P – Premium Epsilon (XTS)
 Y – Corvette (Y-body)
 L – Lambda
 K – Trucks

2nd position is the platform generation.

3rd position is the body style:
 A – Convertible
 B – Coupe
 S – Sedan
 J – Hatchback
 K – CUV?
 L – Long Wheel Base Sedan
 M – Minispace
 U – Crossover/CUV (5 seater)
 Y – SUV/Truck (7 seater)

4th position is the Brand:
 B – Buick	
 C – Chevrolet
 G – GMC
 H – Holden
 L – Cadillac
 M – Citroën (partnership between GM & PSA)
 O – Opel/Vauxhall

5th position is an optional qualifier: for example the Sales market area: 
 S – sales market China
 N – sales market North-America
 I – electric/hybrid

For example, E2UB-N is the Crossover Buick for the North-American market in the second generation of the Epsilon platform.

Historical applications
, GM has produced cars, trucks, and SUVs of multiple different sizes on 107 different platforms: 55 of these with Latin letters, 12 with English spellings of Greek letters, and 40 others. Also, 64 of these platforms are inherently RWD, while the rest are primarily FWD. Furthermore, 50 of these have four-wheel drive variants as well.

Latin-letter platforms

Others

Future platforms 
In 2015 GM announced their intention to shift all of their vehicles (with the notable exception of the eighth-generation Corvette) to four platforms by 2025. The following are those platforms, including the already-launched VSS-F:

It is currently unknown whether GEM or a similar low-cost platform will be continued in some form as a subset of VSS.

EV platforms 

 BEV2, base of the Chevrolet Bolt and Chevrolet Menlo

 Ultium, base of the Hummer H1T and Cadillac Lyriq

See also 

 General Motors, the automotive conglomerate that has produced these platforms
 History of General Motors, for further understanding of GM's past production
 Buick, Cadillac, Chevrolet, GMC, Holden, Baojun, Pontiac, Geo, Saturn, Hummer, Oldsmobile, Marquette, LaSalle, Isuzu, Opel, Vauxhall, Asüna, Viking, Saab, Ravon, Suzuki, Daewoo, Jiefang, and Wuling, current and former marques of General Motors
 Toyota, Alfa Romeo, Jeep, Fiat, Senova, Great Wall, Bitter, Tauro, and Ram, other marques noted here to have used GM platforms
 List of GM engines, for the various engines that have been fit into GM cars
 List of GM transmissions, for the various transmissions that have been fit into GM cars
 Car platform, for further understanding of the components listed here

References

External Links 

 Volvo Truck 2017

 
Opel
Holden